Graham Simpson (13 October 1943 – 17 April 2012) was an English musician. He was a founding member and bassist of Roxy Music, and friend of Bryan Ferry. On their eponymous first album (1972), his bass notes made distinctive contributions to the tracks "Ladytron" and "Chance Meeting".  However, not long after the album was released, Simpson, who was suffering from depression following the death of his mother from cancer, was given an open-ended choice to remain with or take a hiatus from the band by Ferry. Simpson chose to leave the band and never returned to the line-up. He used his band royalties to travel the world learning about different cultures and religions, particularly Sufism, returning to London in 1982. 

Simpson is the subject of a short film called Nothing But The Magnificent that screened at the Portobello Film Festival in 2010. The feature-length version called Mighty was nine years in the making and due to star Hollywood film director Mike Figgis and original members of Roxy Music including Bryan Ferry. Directed by West London filmmaker Miranda Little, Mighty features original material of Simpson by his former neighbour Sara Cook – an enigmatic London artist who also discovered him. Plus footage the pair shot of Simpson together in the summer of 2010. 

Roxy Music were inducted into the Rock and Roll Hall of Fame in March 2019, with Simpson named as an original band member.

He died in Ladbroke Grove, London in April 2012.

References

1943 births
2012 deaths
musicians from Manchester
Roxy Music members
English rock bass guitarists
Male bass guitarists
English Sufis
Glam rock musicians